Waiohiki is a rural community in the Hastings District and Hawke's Bay Region of New Zealand's North Island. It is located between the Ngaruroro and Tutaekuri Rivers, south of Taradale and north of Hastings on State Highway 50. Napier Golf Club is located at Waiohiki.

Waiohiki was inundated by flooding during Cyclone Gabrielle in 2023 after the Ngaruroro River burst its banks. Dozen of houses were destroyed.  One person died after being swept away by floodwater at Waiohiki.

Marae

Waiohiki Marae and meeting house is a meeting place of the Ngāti Kahungunu hapū of Ngāti Pārau.

In October 2020, the Government committed $375,000 from the Provincial Growth Fund to upgrade the marae, creating 35 jobs.

References

Hastings District
Populated places in the Hawke's Bay Region